On November 7, 2006, the District of Columbia held an election for its non-voting House delegate representing the District of Columbia's at-large congressional district. The winner of the race was incumbent Eleanor Holmes Norton (D).

The delegate is elected for two-year terms.

Candidates 
Incumbent Del. Eleanor Holmes Norton, a Democrat, sought re-election for a 9th full term to the United States House of Representatives. Norton was unopposed in this election, receiving opposition only from write-in candidates and winning re-election with 97.3% of the vote.

Results

See also
 United States House of Representatives elections in the District of Columbia

References 

United States House
District of Columbia
2006